Juha Pylväs (born 24 March 1971) is a Finnish politician currently serving in the Parliament of Finland for the Centre Party at the Oulu constituency. He is the current Chair of the parliamentary group of the Centre Party.

References

1971 births
Living people
Centre Party (Finland) politicians
Members of the Parliament of Finland (2015–19)
Members of the Parliament of Finland (2019–23)